The 1969 Dallas Cowboys season was their tenth in the league. The team nearly equalled their previous output of 12–2, winning eleven games with one tie, and qualified for the playoffs for the fourth consecutive season.

The Cowboys were second in the NFL in scoring (369 points), and led the league in rushing yards (2,276) and total yards (5,122). The Cowboys' defense also allowed the fewest rushing yards in the NFL (1,050) and the fewest rushing touchdowns (3).

The Cowboys are one of only two out of the 26 pre-merger NFL and AFL franchises (the other being the Boston/New England Patriots) that have not recorded a tie since the AFL-NFL merger which was completed after this season.

NFL Draft

Schedule

Division opponents are in bold text

Season summary

Week 9 at Redskins

President Richard Nixon was in attendance.

Playoffs

Standings

Roster

References

Dallas Cowboys seasons
Dallas Cowboys
Dallas Cowboys